The 1933 Kentucky Derby was the 59th running of the Kentucky Derby. The race took place on May 6, 1933.

The first two finishers of the race were Brokers Tip, ridden by Don Meade, and Head Play, ridden by Herb Fisher. Head Play led early, but Brokers Tip went through an opening on the inside to pull even. As the horses ran side-by-side down the stretch, their jockeys grabbed and whipped each other, and the race became known as the "fighting finish." The racing stewards declared Brokers Tip the winner by a nose. It was the only victory of his career.

Meade and Fisher later fought in the jockey's room; both were suspended for 30 days for their actions during the race. Fisher claimed that Head Play had won and that Brokers Tip should have been disqualified. Meade, when interviewed 50 years later, said, "I couldn't push him away from me because he had ahold of me, so I had to get ahold of him. So from there down to the wire, that's what it was - grab and grab and grab."

Full results

References

Further reading

1933
Kentucky Derby
Derby